Pseudochelaria pennsylvanica is a moth of the family Gelechiidae. It was described by Dietz in 1900. It is found in North America, where it has been recorded from Arizona, Illinois, Kentucky, North Carolina, Ohio, Pennsylvania, Tennessee and West Virginia.

References

Moths described in 1900
Pseudochelaria